Stanton is a home rule-class city in and the county seat of Powell County, Kentucky, United States.  The population was 2,733 at the 2010 census.

Stanton is the birthplace of Hall of Fame thoroughbred horse trainer Woody Stephens.

History

The first post office to be located in present-day Stanton was established on July 7, 1849 and was named Beaver Pond, because of the settlement's proximity to a small body of water resulting from a beaver dam. In 1852, both the post office and the settlement were renamed Stanton for Richard H. Stanton, who served in Congress from 1849 to 1855 and later as a U.S. senator.

In the late 1800s and early 1900s, Stanton (and nearby Clay City) were booming logging centers for Eastern Kentucky. The city was also connected to much of the country by a railroad that went through the city and county. Since then the railroad has been removed. The original train depot still exists and is home to the Powell County Tourism Association.

Geography

Stanton is located at  (37.847610, -83.859250). Stanton lies in the floodplain of the Red River.

Education
Public education in Stanton is administered by Powell County School District. The district operates Bowen Elementary School, Stanton Elementary School, Powell County Middle School, Powell County High School, and Powell County Alternative School.

Stanton has a lending library, the Powell County Public Library.

Government

Stanton is governed by a Mayor–council form of government. The current mayor is Dale Allen.

The representative body of the city of Stanton is the city council. The council members include: Dixie Lockard, Margarita Arnett, Pam McIntosh Tipton, Charlotte Estes, Linville Bellamy, and Tommy Mays.

The Stanton Police Department (SPD) is a 24-hour department.  The current Chief of Police is Arthur Lacy. SPD is a fully functioning police department that is involved in multiple facets of the community and other law enforcement agencies in the area including Clay City Police Department, Powell County Sheriffs Office, Kentucky State Police, surrounding county agencies, and federal agencies.

Events
During the first weekend in August, Stanton conducts the annual Corn Festival. The Corn Festival has been a tradition in Stanton since the first festival on August 5–6, 1989. The festival has events such as corn eating contests, talent shows, beauty competitions, car shows, and corn hole tournaments. The festival also includes booths with local artisans exhibiting and selling art. The festival draws around 5,000 people annually.

Another event that happens near Stanton is the Powell County Fair in the second week in September. It is held at the local Lion's Club Park (Powell County Fairgrounds). The fair includes many booths of people advertising their businesses and political groups. It also includes a few rides and many events including truck/tractor pulls, greased pig competition and baby pageants.

Demographics

As of the census of 2010, there were 2,733 people, 1,048 households, and 667 families residing in the city. The racial makeup of the city was 92.5% White, 2.4% African American, 0.4% Native American, 0.6% Asian, 0.03% from other races, and 0.4% from two or more races. Hispanic or Latino of any race were 3.1% of the population.

There were 1,048 households, out of which 27.0% had children under the age of 18 living with them, 32.0% were married couples living together, 13.4% had a female householder with no husband present, and 8.9% were non-families. 26.6% of all households were made up of individuals, and 11.0% had someone living alone who was 65 years of age or older. The average household size was 2.60 and the average family size was 3.04.

In the city, the population was spread out, with 27.0% under the age of 18, 8.6% from 18 to 24, 23.3% from 25 to 44, 31.2% from 45 to 64, and 11.6% who were 65 years of age or older. The median age was 39 years. For every 100 females, there were 91.1 males. For every 100 females age 18 and over, there were 86.0 males.

The median income for a household in the city was $25,750, and the median income for a family was $29,781. Males had a median income of $25,081 versus $20,432 for females. The per capita income for the city was $13,521. About 19.5% of families and 31.9% of the population were below the poverty line, including 29.2% of those under age 18 and 21.4% of those age 65 or over.

References

Cities in Powell County, Kentucky
Cities in Kentucky
County seats in Kentucky
Populated places established in 1854
1854 establishments in Kentucky